The CBC Tower may refer to:
 CBC Tower (Mont-Carmel), a broadcast transmission tower near Shawinigan, Quebec, Canada
 CBC Jarvis Street Tower, a broadcast transmission tower in Toronto, Ontario, Canada